Zgornji Razbor is a settlement in the City Municipality of Slovenj Gradec in northern Slovenia. The area is part of the traditional region of Styria. The entire municipality is now included in the Carinthia Statistical Region.

The parish church in the settlement is dedicated to the Prophet Daniel and belongs to the Roman Catholic Archdiocese of Maribor. It dates to the late 16th century.

References

External links
Zgornji Razbor at Geopedia

Populated places in the City Municipality of Slovenj Gradec
Slovenj Gradec